Calgary Southwest was a federal electoral district in Alberta, Canada, that was represented in the House of Commons of Canada from 1988 to 2015. The district was in the southwest part of the City of Calgary, south of Glenmore Trail and west of the Canadian Pacific Railway line.

Former Prime Minister Stephen Harper represented the riding during his leadership.

History
The electoral district was created in 1987 from parts of the Bow River, Calgary West, Calgary East, Calgary South and a small piece of Calgary Centre ridings.

The riding was abolished during the Canadian federal electoral redistribution, 2012, 80% into Calgary Heritage and 20% into Calgary Midnapore.

Members of Parliament

This riding has elected the following members of the House of Commons of Canada:

Members of Parliament
All three of the riding's MPs were prominent: Bobbie Sparrow served in the cabinet led by Kim Campbell, while Preston Manning was the leader of the Reform Party of Canada from 1987 and Leader of the Opposition from 1997 to 2000. Its final MP in the Southwest configuration was Prime Minister Stephen Harper, an economist and a lecturer outside politics. He was elected to Calgary Southwest, shortly after becoming leader of the Canadian Alliance and thus leader of the Opposition, in a 2002 by-election occasioned by Manning's retirement. From 2003, Harper was the leader of the re-formed Conservative Party of Canada, and from 2006, prime minister; he ceased to be both after the 2015 Canadian federal election.

Election results

Note: Change is compared to redistributed 2000 results. Conservative vote is compared to the combined Alliance and Progressive Conservative vote.

Note: Alliance vote is compared to the Reform vote in 1997.

See also
 List of Canadian federal electoral districts
 Past Canadian electoral districts

References

Notes

External links
 
 Expenditures - 2008
 Expenditures - 2004
 Expenditures - 2000
 Expenditures - 1997
 Elections Canada
 Website of the Parliament of Canada

Former federal electoral districts of Alberta
Politics of Calgary